Walter Ruggles "Dynamite" Campbell (14 December 1890, Port Robinson, Ontario – 9 July 1981, Toronto) was a Canadian physician and diabetologist, known as the first physician "to administer insulin to a patient."

Biography
Walter R. Campbell's father, Bruce M. Campbell, was born in 1861 and married Jane Mary "Jennie" Ekins in April 1889. Walter was their first-born child and spent his early childhood years on the family farm in Ontario. In the late 1890s, Bruce Campbell took his family, consisting of his wife, sons, Walter and Lancing (1893–1969), and daughter, Pearl (1895–1991), to California and joined Bruce's two older brothers in the construction business, but he died unexpectedly in 1906. The death of her husband led Jennie Campbell to return to Ontario to enable Walter to pursue higher education and eventually attend medical school in Toronto.

At the University of Toronto, Walter R. Campbell graduated with an B.A. in 1911, an M.A. in 1912, an M.B. in 1915 (qualifying him for the practice of medicine), and an M.D. in 1917. During WW I, Campbell served from 1917 to 1919 in the Canadian Army Medical Corps. In 1918 he treated nephritic casualties at the No. 4 Canadian General Hospital at Basingstoke in Hampshire on the coast of the English Channel. In 1919 he joined the staff of the department of medicine of the University of Toronto and the medical service of Toronto General Hospital; in 1948 he was appointed an associate professor at the former and a senior physician at the latter. He qualified F.R.C.P.C. in 1930 and was elected F.R.S.C. in 1933.

In 1922 Leonard Thompson, a teenaged patient with severe diabetes, was admitted to Toronto General Hospital, where Walter Campbell and Andrew Almon Fletcher were physicians working in the diabetes ward under the direction of Duncan Archibald Graham. Thompson was chosen for the first clinical trial of the pancreatic extract of insulin, supplied by Banting, Best, and Macleod.

The success of insulin lead to visits to Toronto by a steady stream of prominent diabetologists, including Elliott P. Joslin, Russell Morse Wilder, and Rollin Turner Woodyatt.

In 1953 Campbell and Fletcher were both awarded Banting Medals by th American Diabetes Association.

On the 24th of December 1947 he married Elizabeth Frances Goodwin (1917–2001). They had two daughters. His burial took place at Mount Pleasant Cemetery, Toronto.

Selected publications

Articles
 
 
  (This paper was delivered on 3 May 1922 by Macleod at the Washington, D.C., meeting of the Association of American Physicians. See )

Books

References

1890 births
1981 deaths
Canadian diabetologists
20th-century Canadian physicians
University of Toronto alumni
Academic staff of the University of Toronto
People from Thorold
Burials at Mount Pleasant Cemetery, Toronto